Internet Direct, also known as "Indy", is a free software / open source socket library written in Object Pascal, an object-oriented version of Pascal. It includes clients, servers, TCP, UDP, and raw sockets, as well as over 100 higher level protocols implementations such as SMTP, POP3, NNTP, and HTTP. Indy includes support for OpenSSL and Zlib in the protocol implementations. Indy 10 was ported to Free Pascal, and runs on Windows, FreeBSD, Linux, and Darwin.

Internet Direct is available for Borland Delphi, C++ Builder, and Kylix. The software is dual-licensed under the "Indy Modified BSD License" and the "Indy MPL License". As of early 2008, there is a new project called Indy#, which intends to write a C# version from the ground up.

History
Indy was initially named "Winshoes" and was written by Chad Z. Hower (a.k.a. Kudzu) in 1993 in Visual Basic. In 1995, he ported it to Borland Delphi and deprecated the Visual Basic version. In 1997, he made it available under an open-source license. In 2000, Winshoes was renamed to Internet Direct (Indy for short) and became cross-platform. In 2001, Borland began including it as a part of Borland Delphi, C++ Builder, and Kylix. In 2003, Indy was ported to Delphi for .NET.  The following year, Indy was made available to the Microsoft .NET community.

References

External links

Indy Project home page
Indy Knowledge Base

Pascal programming language family
Free Pascal
Pascal (programming language) software